Indhira Rosa Serrano Redondo (born 27 January 1976)) is a Colombian actress and model.

She has appeared in several telenovelas on Telemundo, including La Traición and El Clon.

Selected filmography

Film

Television

References

External links
 

Colombian telenovela actresses
Colombian television actresses
1976 births
Living people
Afro-Colombian